Trstín is a village and municipality of Trnava District in the Trnava region of Slovakia. Located at the foothills of Little Carpathinas it is an important road transport crossroad as two major roads I/61 and II/502 crosses here. Romanesque church from 13th century is the most worth seeing. It also has a large population of jews.

External links
Municipal Information
Romanesque church in Trstín
Blog about the Trstín church
Official page

References 

Villages and municipalities in Trnava District